Tobetsu Dam is a dam currently under construction in Hokkaidō, Japan. It started in 1980 and is scheduled for opening in 2012.

Dams in Hokkaido